The following is a list of all team-to-team transactions that have occurred in the National Hockey League during the 2015–16 NHL season. It lists which team each player has been traded to, signed by, or claimed by, and for which player(s) or draft pick (s), if applicable. Players who have retired are also listed. The 2015–16 trade deadline was on February 29, 2016. Any players traded or claimed off waivers after this date were eligible to play up until, but not in the 2016 Stanley Cup playoffs.

Retirement

Contract terminations 
A team and player may mutually agree to terminate a player's contract at any time.

For more details on contract terminations:

Teams may buy out player contracts (after the conclusion of a season) for a portion of the remaining value of the contract, paid over a period of twice the remaining length of the contract. This reduced number and extended period is applied to the cap hit as well.
If the player was under the age of 26 at the time of the buyout the player's pay and cap hit will reduced by a factor of 2/3 over the extended period. 
If the player was 26 or older at the time of the buyout the player's pay and cap hit will reduced by a factor of 1/3 over the extended period. 
If the player was 35 or older at the time of signing the contract the player's pay will be reduced by a factor of 1/3, but the cap hit will not be reduced over the extended period.

All players must clear waivers before having a contract terminated. Injured players cannot be bought out.

 Richards appealed the contract termination, and on October 9, 2015, Richards and the Kings settled, officially ending Richards' contract with the team.
 Cowen appealed the buyout, and on December 7, 2016, an independent arbitrator sided with the Maple Leafs, officially ending Cowen's contract with the team.

Free agency 
Note: This does not include players who have re-signed with their previous team as an unrestricted free agent or as a restricted free agent.

Imports
This section is for players who were not previously on contract with NHL teams in the past season. Listed is their previous team and the league that they belonged to.

Trades
* Retained Salary Transaction: Each team is allowed up to three contracts on their payroll where they have retained salary in a trade (i.e. the player no longer plays with Team A due to a trade to Team B, but Team A still retains some salary). Only up to 50% of a player's contract can be kept, and only up to 15% of a team's salary cap can be taken up by retained salary. A contract can only be involved in one of these trades twice.

June

July

September

October

November

December

January

February

March

May

June (2016)

Waivers 
Once an NHL player has played in a certain number of games or a set number of seasons has passed since the signing of his first NHL contract (see here), that player must be offered to all of the other NHL teams before he can be assigned to a minor league affiliate.

Staff compensation 
Prior to January 1, 2016 NHL teams received compensation for losing a coach, general manager or president of hockey operations to another team while they are still under contract. Teams received a second-round draft pick if a transaction happened during the season and a third-round pick if one occurred in the off-season (a coach's season ends when his team is eliminated from the playoffs, while seasons for GMs and presidents of hockey operations finish after the conclusion of the NHL Draft in June). Teams will have a three-year window to choose from when to lose their draft pick.

See also
2015–16 NHL season
2015 NHL Entry Draft
2016 NHL Entry Draft
2017 NHL Entry Draft
2015 in sports
2016 in sports
2014–15 NHL transactions
2016–17 NHL transactions

References

External links
TSN transactions
Official NHL Free Agent signings
The Hockey News transactions
Elite Prospects Confirmed Transfers

Transactions
National Hockey League transactions